Pronophaea is a genus of African corinnid sac spiders first described by Eugène Simon in 1897.  it contains only three species, all found in South Africa.

References

Endemic fauna of South Africa
Araneomorphae genera
Corinnidae
Spiders of South Africa
Taxa named by Eugène Simon